USS Douglas H. Fox (DD-779) was an  of the United States Navy.

Namesake
Douglas Harold Fox was born on 26 March 1905 in Walled Lake, Michigan. He attended Dowagiac High School in Dowagiac, Michigan, prior to entering the United States Naval Academy on 8 August 1922. He graduated from the United States Naval Academy on 3 June 1926, but remained there for the summer course in aviation through 11 August. He was detached from Seattle on 12 September 1927, and after two months at the Fifth Naval District at Norfolk, Virginia, joined the battleship  on 5 November. The next two years he trained reservists on board Eagle No. 32, attached to the Twelfth Naval District at San Francisco, California. Upon completing that tour, he travelled to Mare Island Navy Yard, reporting on board  on 24 July 1936 while it fitted out, and became the ship’s gunnery officer upon its commissioning on 27 October 1936. From 5 June 1939 to 31 May 1940 he served as Prestons executive officer. For a couple of months following that assignment, Fox served at the Recruiting Training School at San Diego, California and then from 13 July 1940 to 13 March 1942 was officer in charge of the Naval Recruiting Station at Minneapolis, Minnesota. He briefly attended the Naval Fleet Sound School at Key West, Florida from 16–28 March 1942. On 1 April 1942, he reported to the Bethlehem Steel Co., at Quincy, Massachusetts where Lieutenant commander Fox was given command of the newly commissioned destroyer  on 29 May 1942. He went down with his ship when it was torpedoed and sunk in the Naval Battle of Guadalcanal on 13 November 1942. He was posthumously awarded the Navy Cross. He also later received an Award star in lieu of a second Navy Cross for earlier actions on 26 and 30 October and 3 November in which he had rescued downed aviators and survivors of  under hazardous conditions.

History
Douglas H. Fox was launched 30 September 1944 by Todd-Pacific Shipyards, Inc., Seattle, Washington; sponsored by Mrs. J. T. Boone; and commissioned 26 December 1944.

United States Navy

1945-1946

Okinawa
Douglas H. Fox joined in exercises in the Hawaiian Islands from 31 March 1945 to 21 April 1945, then sailed to join the radar picket line at Okinawa, arriving 5 May 1945. She accounted for 7 planes during a concentrated attack by 11 enemy planes, splashed 5 of her attackers before being hit by a kamikaze and its bomb, and sprayed with gasoline from 1 of her own victims. Although 7 of her crew were killed and 35 wounded, the fires were quickly extinguished and effective damage control measures enabled Fox to reach Kerama Retto under her own power for temporary repairs. She continued to San Francisco for permanent repairs, arriving 23 June.

Return to the US, Atlantic Duty
After refresher training at San Diego, Fox sailed on 30 September 1945 for the East Coast, arriving at New York City 17 October 1945 for the Navy Day celebrations. She put in at her home port of Norfolk, Virginia 2 November 1945 and served on local operations and plane guard duty in the Caribbean. She aided in the shakedown of the aircraft carrier  from 14 January 1945 to 6 March 1946, visiting Rio de Janeiro in February. Fox remained in the Caribbean in various training and escort duties until 14 December 1946 when she arrived at New London for leave and upkeep.

1947-1962
Douglas H. Fox departed Norfolk 21 July 1947 for a tour of duty in the Mediterranean. On 29 September, while bound for Trieste, she struck a World War II era mine which severely damaged her stern, killed 3 and injured 12 of her crew.

Sailing from Newport, Rhode Island, 20 July 1948, Fox returned to the Mediterranean and visited various ports there until 28 September 1948, when she joined the cruiser  for a goodwill cruise to Mombasa, Kenya; Durban, South Africa; and round Cape Horn to Buenos Aires, Rio de Janeiro, and Montevideo. She returned to Norfolk 8 December 1948, for operations off the Virginia Capes until 5 January 1950 when she arrived at Charleston, South Carolina. She was placed out of commission in reserve there 21 April 1950.

Recommissioned 15 November 1950, after the outbreak of war in Korea, Fox served on the East Coast until 22 January 1952 when she got underway from Norfolk for the Far East. She joined the screen of TF 77 on patrol off Korea, and participated in the bombardment of Wonsan 13 March 1952. Later in March, she joined the cruiser  in conducting harassing fire against enemy troops on the east coast of Korea. In May she began independent operations, shelling targets, supporting minesweeping operations, and weakening the North Korean fishing industry by capturing 26 sampans. She got underway from Yokosuka 21 June 1952, and sailed west through the Indian Ocean and the Mediterranean Sea to complete a round-the-world cruise at Norfolk 19 August 1952, this time in a reverse direction.

Fox made a midshipman training cruise to Nova Scotia from 20 June to 8 July 1955, and served tours of duty with the 6th Fleet in the Mediterranean from 7 November 1956 to 20 February 1957. Between 3 September and 22 December 1957, she joined elements of the British and Canadian navies for a NATO exercise in the North Atlantic, visiting the Mediterranean before returning to Norfolk to resume local operations. Between 7 August 1959 and 26 February 1960, she served again in the Mediterranean, as well as in the Red Sea and Persian Gulf, returning to Norfolk for overhaul. From June through the end of 1960, H. Fox operated off the East Coast, cruising north of the Arctic Circle on NATO maneuvers, and patrolling in the Caribbean during political unrest in Central America.

After completing a 1961 Mediterranean deployment, Fox participated in anti-submarine warfare (ASW) exercises and patrols through March 1962. At that time the ship went into the Norfolk Naval Shipyard for a FRAM II (Fleet Rehabilitation and Modernization) conversion. Included in the changes were updated torpedo mounts, and a Drone Anti-Submarine Helicopter (DASH) and Variable-Depth Sonar (VDS) system. In November 1962, she departed from the yard with this increased ASW capability, more modern and comfortable quarters, and a longer life expectancy with the United States Navy.

1963-1973
In December 1962, Douglas H. Fox  reported to the Fleet Training Group at Guantánamo Bay, Cuba for refresher training and base defense. In February and March 1963, the ship took part in Operation Springboard - 63, an extensive training cruise in the Caribbean, after which she resumed her ASW ready duties with the Atlantic Fleet. Early July 1964 found Fox deployed to the Mediterranean, returning in November. In early 1965, she took part in Operation Springboard-65, after which she resumed her ASW duties with Task Group Four.

Summer 1965 found Fox deployed to the Mediterranean and Middle East, where she conducted ASW operations with the Royal Navy and then participated in contingency operations off the coast of Pakistan. During this period, Fox received the Atlantic Fleet ASW Award for her consistent success in the art of anti-submarine warfare. From November 1965 to April 1966 she was in Norfolk Naval Shipyard undergoing overhaul.

In July 1966, she returned to the Mediterranean and paid a visit to Safi, Morocco. Fox was the first American warship to visit Safi in seventeen years. The ship returned to Norfolk 17 December 1966, and in 1967 the ship performed a variety of work with the Second Fleet, with the major emphasis on anti-submarine warfare. Much time was spent in this period in areas just east of Cape Hatteras.

In May 1967, Fox operated with 55 ships from four countries in Operation Fizwiz Sunrise. In June, a NATO exercise called New Look took the ship to the North Atlantic for ten days of highly competitive ASW operations with the Royal Canadian Navy. In addition, there were two weeks of operations out of Key West as a school ship for the Fleet Sonar School. On 1 September 1967 the ship began a five-month deployment with the 6th Fleet in the Mediterranean.

In September 1968, 323 miles southeast of Charleston, South Carolina, while en route for a return visit to Vietnam, a pinhole ruptured in the HPS (High Pressure Steam) pipe in the aft fireroom, killing nine seamen and injuring thirty five. The fire was brought under control and the ship returned to port under tow.  After extensive repairs were completed at Charleston Naval Shipyard, Fox departed again for Vietnam arriving in February 1969. From February to September, she operated in the Vietnam area on a variety of assignments which included plane-guarding in the Tonkin Gulf, and harassment and interdiction fire on a regular basis. She also operated independently providing close-in gunfire support to troops on numerous occasions.

Chilean Navy

On 15 December 1973, Douglas H. Fox was given orders to proceed to the Navy Yard at Philadelphia to be decommissioned. After decommissioning, the ship was sold to Chile for further naval service. Under a different flag and with a new name, Ministro Portales (DD-17) served its new country for another 22 years. Between 1975 and 1976 she was refitted with an extension in the flight deck. Ministro Portales participated in the Beagle-Channel diplomatic conflict in 1978. in this period, all the Chilean navy ships were camouflaged. This ship was decommissioned from the Chilean Navy in 1990. Ministro Portales was sunk off Cape Horn on 11 November 1998 at 15:47 hours (Chilean time).

Awards
Douglas H. Fox received one battle star for World War II service and one for Korean War service.

References

External links
history.navy.mil: USS Douglas H. Fox 
navsource.org: USS Douglas H. Fox
hazegray.org: USS Douglas H. Fox
USS Douglas H. Fox Association
armada.cl: Destructor Ministro Portales
uboat.net: USS Douglas H. Fox (DD-779)

 

Allen M. Sumner-class destroyers of the United States Navy
Ships built in Seattle
1944 ships
World War II destroyers of the United States
Maritime incidents in 1947
Cold War destroyers of the United States
Korean War destroyers of the United States
Vietnam War destroyers of the United States
Allen M. Sumner-class destroyers of the Chilean Navy